Sloveč is a municipality and village in Nymburk District in the Central Bohemian Region of the Czech Republic. It has about 500 inhabitants.

Administrative parts
Villages of Kamilov and Střihov are administrative parts of Sloveč.

References

Villages in Nymburk District